Restaurant management is the profession of managing a restaurant. Associate, bachelor, and graduate degree programs are offered in restaurant management by community colleges, junior colleges, and some universities in the United States.

References

Further reading 
 
 
 
 

Food services occupations
Culinary arts
Hospitality management
Manager